The Spartan Marching Band (SMB) is the marching band of Michigan State University. The band has over 300 members and is the second oldest in the Big Ten Conference, with its founding in 1870. Notable music educator Leonard Falcone directed the band from 1927 through 1967.

The band performs every year at home football games, travels to some away games, as well as various events held by the university. The band has also performed for five U.S. Presidents, performed at five Rose Bowls, two World's Fairs, and one World Series.

History

Beginnings and MAC military band 
The band was founded in 1870 as a 10-member student-led group, shortly after the founding of the Michigan Agricultural College (presently Michigan State University). Ransom McDonough Brooks was a student and former civil war veteran who first led the band. The band operated informally during this time.

In 1885, an ROTC was formed on campus and the band was reorganized as a cadet military band. During this time the band was led by students and military officers, including cornetist I.E. Hill, and Professor B.G. Edgerton, who was the first to lead the band in performance before a President Theodore Roosevelt in 1907.

Other directors in this period included A.J. Clark, Frederick Abel, J.S. Taylor, and Carl Kuhlman. Taylor would lead the first band to perform the new college fight song, written by cheerleader Francis Lankey. That performance would come shortly after young Lankey's death in 1919.

The Falcone years

In 1927, Leonard Falcone started as director of the band. Falcone was an Italian immigrant and the brother of University of Michigan band director Nicholas Falcone. Many of the band's traditions were established during his 40-year tenure and the band changed from a 65-member ROTC auxiliary into an adjunct of the new department that would become today's College of Music.

When the career of Nicholas came to a premature end due to illness in 1935, Leonard agreed to shoulder the burden of directing the bands at both of the rival schools concurrently while his brother sought treatment. MSU began playing Big Ten Conference football in 1952 and during this time the band received its first green and white uniforms. The SMB made their first appearance in the Rose Bowl in 1954.

Falcone was a baritone horn virtuoso, professor of baritone and euphonium, and a prolific transcriber and arranger of music for concert band. He arranged and rearranged the fight song continuously throughout his career.

Falcone drastically increased the visibility of the band through an aggressive schedule of performances and trips. He added 3 US Presidential performances to the band's resume as well as 3 televised Rose Parade and game performances in the 50s and 60s. There was a band shell on the campus where Bessey Hall stands today that was the site of regular band concerts for many years.

From 1960 to 1969, Bill Moffit was assistant director of the band alongside Falcone. Moffit developed the "Patterns in Motion" drill movement concept, centered around a 4-person squad system during this time, including the current pregame drill used by the band.

After Falcone's retirement, Moffit had started a position as the director of the Purdue All-American Marching Band and in 1984, took the Purdue band to Falcone's neighbourhood the morning before a football game to perform on the street.

Falcone retired and took on a role as professor emeritus in 1967, though he remained a fixture around the campus until weeks before his death in 1985.

1970s to modern day

The band was the 1988 recipient of the Sudler Trophy for collegiate marching bands, administered by the John Philip Sousa Foundation.

In 1989, John Madden became director of the band, and after his retirement in 2017, became the second-longest-serving director in band history, 28 years. During his tenure, the band traveled to 17 bowl games, 2 presidential performances and some foreign. Upon his retirement, he earned the distinction of Professor Emeritus and Emeritus Director of the SMB.

The current director is Dr. David Thornton who was a former masters and doctoral student at MSU, and was the assistant director for the 2015 and 2016 seasons.

Former band directors

 A.J. Clark (1907-1916, 1918-1919, 1922-1925)
 Frederic Abel (1916-1918)
 J.S. Taylor (1919-1922)
 Carl Kuhlman (1925-1927)
 Leonard Falcone (1927-1967)
 Harry Begian (1967-1970)
 Kenneth Bloomquist (1970-1977)
 Thad Hegerberg (1977)
 Carl Chevallard (1978)
 Dave Catron (1979-1987)
 William Wiedrich (1988)
 John Madden (1989-2016)

Former assistant or associate band directors

 Oscar Stover (1953-1960)
 William Moffit (1960-1969)
 Joe Parker (1969)
 Dave Catron (1970-1973)
 Thad Hegerberg (1974-1976)
 Carl Chevallard (1977)
 William Wiedrich (1982-1987)
 Isaiah Odajima (2006-2008)
 Cormac Cannon (2009-2014)
 David Thornton (2015-2016)
 Simon Holoweiko (2017)

Instrumentation
The Spartan Marching Band instrumentation is notable among college bands in the U.S. as being made up of brass, saxophones, and percussion, with no flutes, piccolos, or clarinets. Instead, E-flat cornets play the high "woodwind-like" parts. Flutes and clarinets were phased out in the early 1960s as Spartan Stadium expanded and more sound was desired. The E-flat cornet in the SMB instrumentation is reminiscent of the standard British brass band tradition. E-flat alto horns were used until 1980. They were replaced in 1981 by standard mellophones (in F). Bass trombones now (added fall 2018) enhance the trombone section's low end.

In today's SMB, all instruments are provided to members. The presence of "like instruments" has further enhanced the sound of the band, as well as creating a uniform look with silver-plated instruments.

 1 or 2 Drum Majors
 1 to 3 Feature Twirlers
 40 member color guard
 34 Alto Saxophones
 18 Tenor Saxophones
 8 E flat Cornets
 52 B Flat Trumpets
 28 Mellophones
 36 Trombones (+ 4 B Tbns)
 18 Baritones
 24 Sousaphones
 18 Big Ten Flags
 10 or 11 Snare Drums (11 during the 2019 season; 10 for previous seasons) 
 5 or 6 Tenor Drums
 7 Bass Drums
 10 Cymbals

Organization

Current Director 
In 2017, Dr. David Thornton, who previously served as the Associate Director of the Spartan Marching Band in 2015 and 2016, was appointed Director of the Spartan Marching Band and Associate Director of Bands at MSU.

In March 2018, Dr. Arris Golden was selected as Associate Director of the SMB, and Assistant Director of MSU Bands. Prior, Golden had a brief tenure as the assistant director of The Marching Tar Heels.

Instructors and Graduate Assistants
Working directly under the director are graduate assistants and various instructors. Instructors are typically paid positions and their duties include visual, color guard and percussion. Graduate assistants are graduate students from the MSU College of Music who arrange music, design drill, rehearse music, and teach on the field in preparation for halftime and pregame shows. Administratively, graduate assistants conduct challenges and auditions.

Drum Major(s)

Typically, the Spartan Marching Band has only one drum major for the entire ensemble. However, in years when the drum major is a graduating senior there are two, allowing the new drum major to have one season of apprenticeship. The position is chosen through an audition process. The drum major and band president are the top ranking student leaders in the organization.

The "Voice of the Band"
The Announcer for the Spartan Marching Band is also known as the "Voice of the Band."  Throughout the years, the band has only had a few people in this position. "The Voice" introduces the band during Pre-Game, Halftime and Postgame, as well as special events, pep rallies, and Spartan Spectacular, in addition to traveling with the band on away trips and bowl games. The current voice of the band is Peter Clay, who is also the voice of Spartan Football and Spartan Hockey.

Gameday traditions

Morning of Game Day Practice 
The Spartan Marching Band starts every home game day with rehearsal. This practice is open to the public and is a great way for those who cannot attend the football game to see that week's marching band show live. Game day rehearsal times differ due to the start time of the game, but can begin as early as 7 am for noon game days.

Student Bookstore Performance
Before meeting the rest of the band on Adams Field, approximately two hours before kickoff, the Spartan Marching Band Drumline performs for a crowd in the median on Grand River Road in front of the Student Bookstore (commonly known as SBS). Pieces played include "Martian Mambo," "Ditty," "Band Day Beat," "The Series," and "X," the latter of which was composed by Drumline Instructor Jon Weber.

Concert on Adams Field

Before all home games the band performs a free concert on Walter Adams Field (formerly Landon Field) next to the music building. The concert usually begins 1.5–2 hours before kickoff.

The Series
"The Series" is the name of the percussion cadence ("street beat") used by the SMB for parade marching. It is composed of seven different cadences strung together (in series) in march tempo. The co-composers are Merritt Lutz and Joel Leach. It was finalized in 1966. Each cadence has a unique set of maneuvers specific to each section—the tubas, for example, will have horn flashes during one cadence, while the trumpets will perform different horn flashes during another. The Series is extremely intricate and requires hours of practice (in addition to regular pre-season rehearsals) by new members to memorize their section's moves. It uses a full high step throughout (with the exception of the drumline and the color guard), and combined with the intricacy of the upper body movements and vocals, is one of the most physically demanding and uniquely recognizable aspects of the SMB. This is the cadence used as the band marches to Spartan Stadium each game day.

The Kickstep
The Kickstep is a very fast field entrance which has become a trademark of the SMB. It was established in 1950 or 51, with the physical marching steps invented by trumpet player Herb VanDyke of Muskegon. The cadence (drum part) origin is not known. Performed at 220 beats per minute, the kickstep is a run-on routine choreographed in eight-count segments with horn, knee, and hand accents on counts two and four. The kickstep is a highly strenuous physical routine which requires intensive practice and conditioning.

Spinning the "S"
This is a drill move performed by the Spartan Marching Band during the pregame show while playing the Michigan State University fight song. While playing the breakstrain of the fight song, marching band shifts to a hollow Block "S" formation, with the final shape popping up and charging down the field at the exact moment that the chorus of the song begins. The four-man "squad" drill that is unique to the Spartan Marching Band causes the "S" to appear as though it is being "spun" as the marching band shifts to position.

The 7-up
As the Spartan Marching Band plays the fight song during parade marching and the pregame routine, all of the instrumentalists (except for the spartan tubas) and auxiliary performers execute an eight-count horn swing with an accented upward movement on the 8th count. New members learn this maneuver as a "7-up", counted as such: 1 - 2 - 3 - 4 - 5 - 6 - 7 - UP!

Visitor's fight song
A Big Ten tradition, during every pregame show the SMB performs the opposing team's fight song upfield towards the visitor's section. In Spartan Stadium and wherever the band travels, from Hawaii to arch-rival Michigan, the SMB considers it a point of pride and respect to play the opposition's fight song with the utmost musicality.

Fourth quarter cheer
For many years, between the third and fourth quarters of home football games, the percussion section performed their "third quarter cheer" in the southeast endzone. Starting in 2021, due to logistics, the performance has been moved to the first time out in the 4th quarter.  The performance is new each year.

Postgame Show
After every home game, the Spartan Marching Band takes the field one last time to perform selections from the day's halftime show. In addition, the band often performs a favorite postgame tune, usually Carlos Santana's "Everybody's Everything". If the visiting team's band is in attendance, they may also participate in the post-game concert if their schedule permits. Postgame shows traditionally end with MSU's alma mater and fight song to round out another Spartan football experience. After the postgame show, the band may march the Series out of Spartan Stadium to Demonstration Hall, then leave formation to gather together for the final tradition of game day.

Postgame Dismissal 
Here, after words of wisdom, kindness and correction by the band director, members of the SMB sing the alma mater, MSU Shadows, a cappella, in four-part harmony. After dismissal by the drum major(s), the official game day traditions are complete.

If the visiting band is still present at this point in the day, an informal reception may follow and the percussion sections of both bands often join in an drum-off for the entertainment of the crowd.

Big Ten Flags

The Big Ten Flag Corps is a pre-game and parade tradition in the Spartan Marching Band that was added in 1967. Members carry large banner type flags on lance poles, which salute the fourteen universities in the Big Ten Conference. This Corps is made up of individuals who demonstrate the same levels of dedication, work ethic, and athletic ability shown by other members of the SMB. They carry out unique traditions that exhibit the style and form of the Spartan Marching Band.

Other traditions

Preseason Drills

Preseason drills begin 10 days before the beginning of classes. During this week, new members can spend over 120 hours practicing. Percussionists and Color Guard members arrive ten days before the start of classes, followed by section leaders, squad leaders, and the drum major(s) for classroom leadership training. New members arrive next, receiving detailed fundamental instructions, and the remaining veteran members arrive last. Typically, music and field rehearsals begin at 8:30 A.M. and last, with breaks, until 8:50 P.M. New members of the SMB are required to attend "freshmen orientation" sessions and rehearsals inside Demonstration Hall for 3 or 4 evenings from 9 P.M. to 11 P.M. Preseason Drills end with a lighter schedule on the day before classes start. On this day uniforms are inspected and full-band/section pictures occur in uniform, essentially creating a dress rehearsal for the proper wearing of the uniform. A practice "march to the stadium" usually occurs (not in uniform) on the Monday before the first home game, followed by an in the stands rehearsal to end preseason drills.

Memorized music

The Spartan Marching Band learns a new halftime show for every home game of the season. All members are expected to have their music memorized by Thursday of the week of the game. Any member, despite rank in the block, may be pulled out of a show for that week for not having music or the marching drill memorized. Full-sized flip-folders are never used. All freshmen and veterans assigned to a new part must play all the MSU bleacher cheers and pregame music for their section leaders from memory by the end of Freshmen Dress Rehearsal, or forfeit their place in the block, becoming an alternate.

MSU Shadows
Every band member must learn the MSU alma mater, MSU Shadows, which was arranged by MSC Music Professor H. Owen Reed, with words by coach Barney Traynor. Sung in four-part harmony, MSU Shadows was introduced in 1948 and is played and/or sung by the band. After marching to Spartan Stadium, the band gathers near the tunnel leading onto the football field and sings before lining up for the pregame Kickstep entrance. It is always played during the Pregame performance. MSU Shadows is also sung at the end of game days, after marching back and usually performing for the sizable crowd of band fans. After the final home game of the year after the seniors sing the infrequently-sung second verse, the content of which is about one's love for MSU remaining after graduating. MSU Shadows is also featured prominently during the annual Alumni Band Reunion Day, during which band alumni gather from around the world to perform at halftime during a home game.

Sparty Watch

Sparty Watch is a band-sponsored event beginning Monday night before the University of Michigan game and ending the evening after the game. Sparty Watch is a 24-hours/day guard of the Spartan statue to prevent vandalism. The football coach has been known to show up with food for the hungry band members camped out in the cold.

High School Band Day

High School Band Day was a long-running tradition in Spartan Stadium where high school bands from across the state were invited to perform during a home game halftime. The first Band Day was held on November 6, 1954. In its heyday, the event gathered more than 3,000 musicians. After nearly forty years, the tradition ended in 2001. Then for a brief period, the SMB hosted the popular "Spartan Invitational," a field show format exhibition where HS Bands from across the region performed for thousands of spectators, as well as for select adjudicators from across the country. The event was no longer feasible as Spartan Stadium went back to a natural grass surface.

Halftime Shows

2023

Bowl games
The Spartan Marching Band enjoys a long-standing tradition of traveling to bowl games. There is no further audition required for band members; all members are required to participate in the travel (which is not the case in other Big Ten bands). There is no cost to students.
Bowl appearances for the Spartan Band include: 2015 College Football Playoff Cotton Bowl, 2015 Cotton Bowl, 1954, 1956, 1966, 1988, and 2014 Rose Bowls(Rose Bowl) Pasadena California; 2009 and 2011;Capital One Bowl (Orlando, FL); 2012 Outback Bowl (Tampa, FL); 2013 Buffalo Wild Wings Bowl (Tempe, AZ); 2007 Champs Sports Bowl (Orlando, FL); 2003 and 2010 Alamo Bowl (San Antonio, TX); 2001 Silicon Valley Football Classic (San José, CA); 2000 Citrus Bowl (Orlando, FL); 1996 and 1990 Sun Bowl (El Paso, TX); 1995 Independence Bowl (Shreveport, LA); 1993 St. Jude Liberty Bowl (Memphis, TN); 1990 John Hancock Bowl (El Paso, TX); 1989 Mazda Gator Bowl (Jacksonville, FL); 1985 All-American Bowl (Birmingham, AL); and 1984 Cherry Bowl (Pontiac, MI). A portion of the SMB also traveled to the 1993 Coca-Cola Bowl in Tokyo, Japan and the 1997 Aloha Bowl in Honolulu, HI.

References

External links

Big Ten Conference marching bands
Musical groups from Michigan
Musical groups established in 1870
Spartan Marching Band
1870 establishments in Michigan